The glyoxalase system is a set of enzymes that carry out the detoxification of methylglyoxal and the other reactive aldehydes that are produced as a normal part of metabolism. This system has been studied in both bacteria and eukaryotes. This detoxification is accomplished by the sequential action of two thiol-dependent enzymes; firstly glyoxalase І, which catalyzes the isomerization of the spontaneously formed hemithioacetal adduct between glutathione and 2-oxoaldehydes (such as methylglyoxal) into S-2-hydroxyacylglutathione. Secondly, glyoxalase ІІ hydrolyses these thiolesters and in the case of methylglyoxal catabolism, produces D-lactate and GSH from S-D-lactoyl-glutathione.

This system shows many of the typical features of the enzymes that dispose of endogenous toxins. Firstly, in contrast to the amazing substrate range of many of the enzymes involved in xenobiotic metabolism, it shows a narrow substrate specificity. Secondly, intracellular thiols are required as part of its enzymatic mechanism and thirdly, the system acts to recycle reactive metabolites back to a form which may be useful to cellular metabolism.

Overview of Glyoxalase Pathway 
Glyoxalase I (GLO1), glyoxalase II (GLO2), and reduced glutathione (GSH). In bacteria, there is an additional enzyme that functions if there is no GSH, it is called the third glyoxalase protein, glyoxalase 3 (GLO3). GLO3 has not been found in humans yet.

The pathway begins with methylglyoxal (MG), which is produced from non-enzymatic reactions with DHAP or G3P produced in glycolysis. Methylglyoxal is then converted into S-d-lactoylglutathione by enzyme GLO1 with a catalytic amount of GSH, of which is hydrolyzed into non-toxic D-lactate via GLO2, during which GSH is reformed to be consumed again by GLO1 with a new molecule of MG. D-lactate ultimately goes on to be metabolized into pyruvate.

Regulation 
There are several small molecule inducers that can induce the glyoxalase pathway by either promoting GLO1 function to increase conversion of MG into D-Lactate, which are called GLO1 activators, or by directly reducing MG levels or levels of MG substrate, which are called MG scavengers. GLO1 activators include the synthetic drug candesartan or natural compounds resveratrol, fisetin, the binary combination of trans-resveratrol and hesperetin (tRES-HESP), mangiferin, allyl isothiocyanate, phenethyl isothiocyanate, sulforaphane, and bardoxolone methyl, and MG scavengers include aminoguanidine, alagebrium, and benfotiamine. There is also the small molecule pyridoxamine, which acts as both a GLO1 activator and MG scavenger.

Many inhibitors of GLO1 have been discovered since GLO1 activity tends to be promoted in cancer cells, thus GLO1 serves as a potential therapeutic target for anti-cancer drug treatment and has been the focus of many research studies regarding its regulation in tumor cells.

Medical Applications/Pharmacology 
Hyperglycemia, a side effect caused by diabetes, combines with oxidative stress to create advanced glycation end-products (AGEs) that can lead to diabetic retinopathy (RD) and cause symptoms such as blindness in adults.

The manipulation of the glyoxalase system in mice retina has shown there is a potential for targeting the glyoxalase system to use as a therapeutic treatment for RD by lowering the production of AGEs.

Oxidative stress can lead to worsening neurological diseases such as Alzheimer's, Parkinson's, and Autism Spectrum Disorder. Flavonoids, a type of antioxidant that combats oxidative stress in the body, has been found to help decrease the production of radical oxygen species (ROS) mostly by preventing the formation of free radicals but also partially by promoting the glyoxalase pathway via increasing transcription of GSH and GSH constituent subunits to increase intracellular levels of GSH.

Major metabolic pathways converging on the glyoxalase cycle 
Although the glyoxalase pathway is the main metabolic system that reduces methylglyoxal levels in the cell, other enzymes have also been found to convert methylglyoxal into non-AGE producing species: specifically, 99% of MG is processed by glyoxalase metabolism, while less than 1% is metabolized into hydroxyacetone by aldo-keto reductases (AKRs) or into pyruvate by aldehyde dehydrogenases (ALDH). Other reactions have been found to produce MG that also feeds into the glyoxalase pathway. These reactions include catabolism of threonine and acetone, peroxidation of lipids, autoxidation of glucose, and degradation of glycated proteins.

See also

References 

Metabolism